Bongeen is a rural locality in the Toowoomba Region, Queensland, Australia.

Geography 
The now-closed Cecil Plains railway line passed through the locality. There were two railway stations within the locality on the line (both abandoned):

 Bongeen railway station
 Norillee railway station
The Toowoomba–Cecil Plains Road runs through from east to west.

History 
Bongeen State School opened on 4 May 1939. It was mothballed on 31 December 2005 and closed on 31 December 2006. It was at 7-15 Bongeen School Road (north-west corner of Pipeline Road).

Bongeen Church of Christ opened 1964, opposite the school.

Education 
There are no schools in Bongeen. The nearest government primary schools are Mount Tyson State School in neighbouring Mount Tyson to the east, Brookstead State School in neighbouring Brookstead to the south, and Jondaryan State School in Jondaryan to the north-west. The nearest government secondary schools are Cecil Plains State School (to Year 10) in Cecil Plains to the west, Pittsworth State High School (to Year 12) in Pittsworth to the south-east, and Oakey State High School (to Year 12) in Oakey to the north-east.

Amenities 
Bongeen Church of Christ is on the north-east corner of Bongeen School Road and Pipeline Road.

References

Further reading 

 

Toowoomba Region
Localities in Queensland